This is a list of Democratic party unpledged delegates, also known as superdelegates or automatic delegates, who voted in the 2008 Democratic National Convention, the culmination of the party's presidential nominating process that began with the 2008 Democratic Party presidential primaries and caucuses.

At the time of Hillary Clinton's campaign suspension on June 7, 2008, the count was 246½ for her and 478 for Barack Obama, with 99 still 'Uncommitted' of the 823½ total then existing, although this number represents the realignment of around 50 superdelegates who switched their support from Clinton to Obama when he had gained the majority of delegates. Clinton released her delegates during the convention.

The breakdown by position for Clinton was 144 DNC, 52½ Representatives, 14 Senators, 17 Add-ons, 10½ Governors, and 7½ DPLs;
the breakdown by position for Obama was 229 DNC, 157 Representatives, 34 Senators, 29 Add-ons, 20 Governors, and 9 DPLs;
and the breakdown for "Uncommitted" was: 39 DNC, 22 Representatives, 1.5 Senators, 32.5 Add-ons, 1 Governor, and 3 DPLs.

Composition
The Democratic Party's official rules do not use the term "superdelegate." This is an informal name for about 20% of all delegates, whose status as delegates is independent of primary and caucus results and who are officially unpledged to any candidate.  About half of the superdelegates are current Democratic elected officials – Governors, U.S. Senators and Representatives. The other half consists of other party leaders.

The following totals reflect the fact that superdelegates from Florida and Michigan will be seated at the convention, but with only one-half vote each, because of their states' violations of scheduling rules.

Unpledged party leaders and elected officials
The formal description (in Rule 9.A) is "unpledged party leader and elected official delegates" (Unpledged PLEOs).
 19.5 votes from 20 Distinguished Party Leaders (DPL). Officially there are 23 delegates in this category, but this includes sitting elected officials (2 Senators and 1 Governor), who are here counted in those categories. Former party Chairman Kenneth M. Curtis (FL) has 0.5 vote.
 31.5 votes from 32 Democratic Governors. This category includes 28 state Governors, the Mayor of DC, and 3 Governors of Territories. Michigan Gov. Jennifer Granholm has 0.5 vote.
 49.5 votes from 51 members of the Senate. This category includes 49 U.S. Senators and the 2 Shadow Senators from DC. The 3 Senators from Michigan and Florida have only 0.5 vote each.
 231.5 votes from 238 members of the House of Representatives. This category includes 234 Representatives from the states, and 4 Congressional Delegates from DC and from the Territories. The 15 Michigan and Florida Representatives have only 0.5 vote each.
 413 votes from 432 Democratic National Committee Members. A total of 38 DNC delegates (12 from Florida, 18 from Michigan, and 8 representing Democrats Abroad) have only 0.5 vote each.

The PLEOs listed above currently represent a total of 745 votes. However, that tally is subject to change as events affect individual delegates. For example, the count has decreased due to the death of Rep. Tom Lantos; the loss of one half of Ken Curtis' vote because of his current residency in Florida; the resignation of Eliot Spitzer as Governor of New York (his replacement, David Paterson, was already a superdelegate as a DNC member); and the resignation of Representative Albert Wynn. The count has increased because of the special-election victories of Reps. Bill Foster (IL-14), André Carson (IN-7), Jackie Speier (CA-12), Don Cazayoux (LA-6), Travis Childers (MS-1), and Donna Edwards (MD-4). A more complete history of superdelegate composition changes is provided in a later section.

Finally, note that the tallies here reflect eligibility only; the final, official vote tally will be determined solely by the number of eligible delegates who actually participate in the national convention.

Unpledged PLEO delegates should not be confused with pledged PLEOs.  Under Rule 9.C, the pledged PLEO slots are allocated to candidates based on the results of the primaries and caucuses.

Unpledged add-ons
Under Rule 9.B, each state party selects one or more "unpledged add-on delegates," intended for other elected officials and party leaders not included in the above groups. There are 76 such slots, which are filled according to Democratic Party rules; in practice, it is usually the chairperson of the state Democratic Party who appoints the add-ons, effectively allowing the state chairs to multiply their vote. The formal selection of add-ons is performed at the state party's convention or at a state executive committee meeting. All 76 add-ons are scheduled to be identified by June 21, 2008.

Totals
The following are the totals according to this list. Other organizations have reported different numbers based on pledged or expected support.

Notes:
 Democrats Abroad superdelegates count for ½ vote. Barack Obama is endorsed by five Democrats Abroad superdelegates giving 2.5 votes, Hillary Clinton is endorsed by three giving 1.5 votes.
 "Unassigned" includes vacant PLEO delegates as well as Add-on delegates that have not yet been assigned.

Totals by group

¹ For purposes of this list members of Congress and governors are counted in that category even if they are also members of the DNC or are a Distinguished Party Leader (DPL).  The DNC, however, considers such delegates to be DNC members or DPL's first.  The following members of Congress and governors are either DNC members or are DPL's:  Reps. Joe Baca, Mike Honda, Eddie Bernice Johnson, Carolyn Cheeks Kilpatrick, Gregory Meeks, Nancy Pelosi, and Maxine Waters. Sens. Robert Byrd (DPL), Chris Dodd (DPL), Harry Reid, and Debbie Stabenow.  Govs. Tim Kaine, Joe Manchin, Ruth Ann Minner, David Paterson, and Ed Rendell (DPL). Florida and Michigan delegations not yet updated to reflect full votes.

² Includes former presidents, former vice presidents, former house and senate leaders, and former party chairs.

Totals by state

* Democrats Abroad have ½ vote. [Florida, and Michigan superdelegates not yet updated for full votes.]

Details
The following table includes all superdelegate positions.  Vacant positions are last, the others are sorted alphabetically by name. To re-sort these tables, click on the double-arrow symbol at the top of a column.

List of seated superdelegates

The table below consists of 856 entries comprising 852 votes, as follows.
 Unpledged PLEOs: 775 delegates, accounting for 771 votes:
 767 delegates from states and territories, each with 1 vote (note: includes 4 vacancies, listed at the end).
 8 Democrats Abroad delegates, each with ½ vote. Total: 4 votes.
 Unpledged Add-ons: 81 delegates, with 1 vote each. Total: 81 votes.

Notes
* Democrats Abroad superdelegates have ½ vote. [Florida and Michigan delegations not yet un-marked.]

↔ Gov. Ed Rendell (PA), Sen. Robert Byrd (WV), and Sen. Chris Dodd (CT) are credentialed by the DNC as Distinguished Party Leaders

↓ Rep. Brad Ellsworth (IN) has committed to vote for Clinton in deference to their constituents' votes in the state primaries.  They explicitly distinguish this from an "endorsement" and have not personally endorsed either candidate.

Ж Commit Date is the actual date of commitment or earliest instance of public support.  For reasons of file size management, candidate-by-candidate citations may not be provided.  The best source of this information is from the press releases and blog entries of the candidate websites: hillaryclinton.com and barackobama.com. January 20, 2007, is the date Senator Hillary Clinton opened her exploratory committee for the Presidential Democratic nomination and is thus considered the first date that a superdelegate can endorse her. February 10, 2007 is the date Senator Barack Obama announced his candidacy for the Presidential Democratic nomination and is thus considered the first date that a superdelegate can endorse him.

† The "Pelosi Club" is an informal name for a group of superdelegates who announced their intention to vote for the candidate who won the absolute majority of pledged delegates(Barack Obama). The group is named for its first two members, House Speaker Rep. Nancy Pelosi (CA) and her daughter Christine Pelosi (CA DNC), who announced their intention on March 30. The group prominently includes Former President Jimmy Carter (GA DPL, announced May 1); other members are Sen. Maria Cantwell (WA), Denise Johnson (TX; April 6), and Rep. Chris Van Hollen (MD, May 24). Somewhat confusingly, Sen. Cantwell is on record endorsing Clinton, but she has vowed to vote for the pledged delegate leader. [Note: Please do *not* move these delegates to Obama's column without a specific endorsement first since it is only a conditional pledge, per DCW May 20 update.]

There are also 'former members' of the Pelosi Club. All of the following have since gone on to become outright Obama delegates, and are listed here together with the date they were recognized as such: Former DNC Chair Roy Romer (CO DPL, May 13). Rep. Zoe Lofgren (CA, May 22), former Sen. Tom Daschle (SD DPL, May 22), Rep. Robert Wexler (FL, May 22), and charter Pelosi Club member Betty Richie (TX DNC, May 29).

History of superdelegate composition changes

References

External links
 Official Unpledged Party Leaders and Elected Officials List – Official list from Democratic Party website.
 Superdelegates from 2008 Democratic Convention Watch, separate lists by name of committed and uncommitted, grouped by state within candidate
 Superdelegates from The Politico, committed and uncommitted totals by state and position
 Superdelegates Map from Superdelegates.org, Google Map of Superdelegates

Superdelegates
2008-related lists
Lists of American politicians
Lists of political people

Democratic Party (United States)-related lists